USS Navajo may refer to more than one United States Navy ship:

 , a tug in commission from 1908 to 1937 and in non-commissioned service from 1942 to 1946
 , a tug commissioned in 1940 and sunk in 1943
 , an auxiliary ocean tug in commission from 1945 to 1962
 , a fleet ocean tug in service with the Military Sealift Command since 1980
 , a patrol vessel in commission from 1917 to 1919
 , the lead ship of the Navajo class of rescue and salvage ships, currently under construction

United States Navy ship names